Stéphane Bohli (born 25 July 1983) is a professional tennis player from Switzerland.

Junior Grand Slam finals

Doubles: 1 (1 title)

ATP career finals

Doubles: 1 (1 runner-up)

ATP Challenger and ITF Futures finals

Singles: 19 (10–9)

Doubles: 11 (7–4)

Performance timeline

Singles

External links
 
 
 
 

1983 births
Living people
Swiss male tennis players
Tennis players from Geneva
US Open (tennis) junior champions
Grand Slam (tennis) champions in boys' doubles